Henrik Lundberg may refer to:

Henrik Lundberg (ice hockey forward) (born 1991), Swedish ice hockey forward
Henrik Lundberg (ice hockey goaltender) (born 1991), Swedish ice hockey goaltender